Willy Arend (2 May 1876 in Hanover – 25 March 1964 in Berlin) was a German track cyclist.

Next to cycling Arend had a sigarett business in Berlin.

Major results

1896
1st National Sprint Championships
1897
1st  World Sprint Championships
1st European Sprint Championships
1st National Sprint Championships
1900
3rd World Sprint Championships
1901
1st European Sprint Championships
1903
2nd World Sprint Championships
2nd European Sprint Championships
1904
2nd European Sprint Championships
1910
1st Six Days of Bremen (with Eugen Stabe)
1st Six Days of Kiel (with Eugen Stabe)
1921
1st National Sprint Championships

References

1876 births
1964 deaths
Sportspeople from Hanover
German male cyclists
UCI Track Cycling World Champions (men)
German track cyclists
Cyclists from Lower Saxony